Metasia parvalis is a moth in the family Crambidae. It was described by Aristide Caradja in 1916. It is found in Turkey and on Cyprus.

Subspecies
Metasia parvalis parvalis
Metasia parvalis cypriusella Slamka, 2013 (Cyprus)

References

Moths described in 1916
Metasia